Knut Conrad Borge (2 September 1949 – 9 April 2017) was a Norwegian journalist and entertainer.

Borge came from Bærum, and took upper secondary education with emphasis on economic subjects at Nadderud Upper Secondary School. He became a freelancer for the Norwegian Broadcasting Corporation in 1973. 

Among his shows were Borgulfsen, with Torkjell Berulfsen from 1984 to 1997, and Swing&Sweet, with Leif "Smoke Rings" Anderson from 1986 to 1999. He hosted the Spellemannprisen show several times. 

From 2004 onward, he hosted a relaunch of the classical quiz show 20 spørsmål, which attained up to more than a million viewers. He worked as a jazz columnist and journalist for Verdens Gang from 1979-89, and for Dagens Næringsliv from 1990-95. His books include Det største siden Svartedauen from 1986, and Kjære Skrythals from 1994 (with Tore Skoglund).

Awards
Borge was awarded the Molderosen at the Moldejazz festival in 1982. 

Borge was awarded the Lytterprisen from Riksmålsforbundet in 1996.

References

External links

1949 births
2017 deaths
People from Bærum
Norwegian journalists
Norwegian entertainers
Norwegian music journalists
NRK people
Jazz writers
Norwegian columnists